Changchun University of Science and Technology is a key university in Changchun, Jilin, China, previously known as Changchun Institute of Optics and Fine Mechanics. It was founded by Wang Daheng in 1958.

After half a century's development and construction, Changchun University of Science and Technology has been developed into a multidisciplinary university with opto-electronic technology as its outstanding feature and the integration of optics, mechanics, electronics, computer science as well as material science as its superiority.

Following the educational philosophy of "Focusing on Cultivation, Advocating Science" and the university motto of "Virtuous, Learned, Truthful, Innovative", the university is endeavouring to reach the goal of being "provincially top, nationally advanced, and internationally well-known". Changchun University of Science and Technology is ranked 3rd in Jilin province, in the top 15 among its kind of science and technology universities and in the top 150 out of 2845 universities in China. Most of the engineering courses are ranked in the top 20. For example, optical engineering (2nd), instrument technology and sciences (11th), mechanics (13th), software engineering (13th), computer science (15th), control science and engineering (15th), and material science (16th).

The university is particularly renowned for its optical-electrical engineering which is constantly considered one of the best in China along with Zhejiang University. It is a founding member of the prestigious "Seven of Chinese Military Higher Education Institute Group". The university is affiliated with the Ministry of National Defense of the People's Republic of China and administrated by Jilin Provincial Education Department. It has been listed in the "Mid-Western Higher Education Institute Infrastructure Project" in 2012, mostly known as the "Small 211 project" in China.

Changchun University of Science and Technology has accepted nearly 1000 international students since 1987. The international students come from over 30 countries including the United States, Russia, Britain, Canada, Norway, Bangladesh, Kazakhstan, South Korea, Sudan, Mongolia, North Korea, Vietnam, Japan, Mali, Ethiopia, Kenya, and Micronesia.

Schools and colleges
School of Science
School of Photoelectric Engineering
School of Mechatronical Engineering
School of Electronics and Information Engineering
School of Computer Science and Technology
School of Material Science and Engineering 
School of Chemistry and Environmental Engineering
School of Life Science and Technology
school of Biological and Medical Engineering
School of Economics and Management
School of Foreign Languages
School of Chinese Literature
School of Law
School of Software
School of Artificial intelligence

Libraries
CUST Library was initially founded in 1958, simultaneously with the university itself. With unanimous growth with CUST, the infrastructure of the libraries as well as other aspects of dedication have maintained steady development. Since nearly half a century's construction, two large and modern libraries with its unique features of collection are now erupting at both the east campus and west campus of CUST. Following CUST's overall layout and programming, the library in the east campus nominates a collection of books in the fields of sciences while the library in the west campus mainly collects books involving the fields of humanities.

The libraries have now a collection of 1,772,000 copies of books in Chinese and foreign languages. The floor area of the libraries is 32,621 square meters.

Courses

Undergraduate programs
Information and Computing Science
Applied Physics
Electronic Science and Technology
Optical Information Science and Technology
Optical-electronics Technology
Micro-electronics
Measuring and Controlling Technology and Equipment
Optical and Electronic Information Engineering
Mechanical Design Manufacture and Automation
Mechanical and Electronic Engineering
Processing Equipment and Control
Electrical Engineering and Automation
Electronic Information Engineering
Telecommunication Engineering
Automation
Electronic Information Science and Technology
Computer Science and Technology
Software Engineering
Network Engineering
Inorganic Non-metallic Materials Engineering
Material Chemistry
Environmental Science
Chemical Engineering and Technology
Biological technology
Biological Engineering
Biological and Medical Engineering
Economics
Financial Engineering
Marketing
Information Management and Information System
International economy and Business Economics
Business Administration
Accounting
Labor and Social Insurance
English Language
Japanese Language
Russian Language
Korean Language
Chinese Language and Literature
Advertisement
Chinese as a Foreign Language
Art design
Industrial Design
Law

Postgraduate programs
Theoretical Physics
Particle Physics and Nuclear Physics
Atom and Molecule physics
Plasma Physics
Radio Physics
Condensed Matter Physics
Acoustics
Optics
Physical electronics
Micro-electronics and Solid State Electronics
Optical engineering
Precise instruments and Machinery
Testing and Metrological Technology and Instruments
Programs of Master Degree
Mechanical manufacture and Automation
Mechanical and Electronic Engineering
Mechanical design and Theory
Electromagnetic field and Microwave technology
Electric Circuit and System
Telecommunication and Information System
Signal and Information Processing
Test Technology and Automation Device
Mode identification and Intelligent System
Computer Software and Theory
Computer system structure
Computer applied technology
Material physics and Chemistry
Material Science
Material processing engineering
Inorganic Chemistry
Physical Chemistry
Applied Chemistry
Biological and Medical Engineering
Management Science and Engineering
Industrial Economics
Enterprise management
Foreign Languages and Applied Linguistics
Chinese Philology
Constitution and Administration Law
MBA- Master in Business Administration

Ph.D. programs
Optics
Physical Electronics
Optical engineering
Equipment science and Technology
Precise Instruments and Machinery
Measuring and Controlling Technology and Equipment
Machinery manufacture and Automation
Mechanical Engineering
Mechanical and Electronic Engineering
Mechanical design and Theory
Telecommunication and Information System
Material physics and Chemistry

Optical-Electric Engineering School
The optical electric engineering school, established in 1958, originated from the optical electric engineering department. There are five departments: optical engineering department, instrumental science and technology department, detection and information engineering department, photo electronics institution and the institute of space technology. There is one national key major, two Doctoral (optical engineering and instrumental science and technology), three master's programs (optical engineering, measuring and testing technology, and fine instruments), and four bachelor programs (controlling technology and instruments, optical-electric information engineering, information confrontation, detection guidance and controlling technology).

Notable people

Affiliations
 Commission for Science, Technology and Industry for National Defense
 Jilin Provincial Education Department

References

External links
Official Chinese language website
Official English language website

 
Technical universities and colleges in China